Enrique Granados (9 August 1934 – 27 October 2018) was a Spanish freestyle swimmer.  He competed in two events at the 1952 Summer Olympics.

References

External links
 

1934 births
2018 deaths
Spanish male freestyle swimmers
Olympic swimmers of Spain
Swimmers at the 1952 Summer Olympics
Swimmers from Barcelona